Gore Airport , also known as Charlton Aerodrome, is an aerodrome between Gore and Mataura in New Zealand.  It is 3.5 miles South West of Gore on SH1.

Operational Information 
Circuits left hand all runways.
BP avgas 100 swipecard. Jet A1 available on request.
No landing fees.

Sources 
New Zealand AIP (PDF)

The aerodrome is home to Phoenix Aviation whose main business is aerial crop dressing.

Airports in New Zealand
Gore, New Zealand
Transport buildings and structures in Southland, New Zealand